Jane Dolan is a camogie player, winner of  Soaring Star Awards in 2010, 2011, 2012, 2015, 2016, 2017 and 2021. She also plays for DIT. Her injury time point secured the National League Division 3 title in 2011. With a total of 2-24 she was the second scoring player in the Kay Mills Cup of 2011.

Scoring feat
In 2008 she scored 5-6 for Meath over Louth in an 11–17 to 0–2 victory in the National League.

Other awards
All Ireland medal winner Junior 2010, Intermediate 2017.

References

External links
 Camogie.ie Official Camogie Association Website

1988 births
Living people
Dublin camogie players
Meath camogie players
Alumni of Dublin Institute of Technology